Dan T. Coenen is an American lawyer, currently the University Professor & Harmon W. Caldwell Chair in Constitutional Law at University of Georgia and previously the J. Alton Hosch Professor of Law.

Biography
Coenen was born in Dubuque, Iowa, where he attended public schools, and educated at the University of Wisconsin, receiving a B.S. in 1974. In 1978, he graduated from Cornell Law School, where he was Editor-in-Chief of Cornell Law Review. After law school, Coenen clerked for Clement Haynsworth of the United States Court of Appeals for the Fourth Circuit, and then Justice Harry Blackmun of the United States Supreme Court in 1979-80 before entering private practice. In 1987, Coenen began teaching at University of Georgia Law School and was elevated to University Professor in 2005. In 2011, he was named associate dean for faculty development. His research concern is constitutional law. In 2015, his salary was $268,000.

See also
List of law clerks of the Supreme Court of the United States (Seat 2)

Select publications

Books

Articles

References

External links

People from Dubuque, Iowa
University of Georgia faculty
American lawyers
University of Wisconsin–Madison alumni
Cornell Law School alumni
Year of birth missing (living people)
Living people
Law clerks of the Supreme Court of the United States
American scholars of constitutional law